Edward Thomas Harris (30 June 1879 – 6 October 1966) was an Australian rules footballer who played with Collingwood in the Victorian Football League (VFL).

Notes

External links 
		
Eddie Harris's profile at Collingwood Forever

1879 births
1966 deaths
Australian rules footballers from Victoria (Australia)
Collingwood Football Club players
People from Warrnambool